Aeroporto Guglielmo Marconi di Bologna S.p.A. (AdB) is the operator of Bologna Guglielmo Marconi Airport, The company is listed in Borsa Italiana (Milan Stock Exchange).

History
Aeroporto Guglielmo Marconi di Bologna  and Società Azionaria Gestione Aeroporto Torino had a cross ownership until February 2014, which AdB sold their minority interests (4.13%) to 2i Aeroporti and Tecnoinvestimenti (a subsidiary of Tecno Holding) for €5.166 million.

Shareholders
After the company was listed in the Milan Stock Exchange in 2015, Chamber of Commerce of Bologna was the major shareholders of 37.559% stake, followed by equity funds that runs by Amber Capital (15.082%) and Strategic Capital Advisers (10.510%). The fourth largest shareholders was 2i Aeroporti, which owned 0.970% shares directly, as well as through controlling interests in Aeroporti Holding, a subsidiary of Società Azionaria Gestione Aeroporto Torino (SAGAT) for 5.913% shares of AdB. 51% shares of 2i Aeroporti was owned by Primo Fondo Italiano per le Infrastrutture and around 45% shares of both SAGAT and Aeroporti Holding were owned by minority shareholders.

References

External links
 Investor Relations

Companies based in Bologna
Transport in Emilia-Romagna
Airport operators of Italy
Privatized companies of Italy